The Diocese of Macau is a Latin Church ecclesiastical territory or diocese of the Catholic Church, in contrast with the Diocese of Hong Kong, which is, de jure, part of the Ecclesiastical Province of Guangdong.

The territory of the Diocese of Macau encompasses Macau, a special administrative region of China. In theory, a part of Guangdong province also belongs to the diocese, but in practice, the diocese is limited to Macau.

Its cathedral is the Cathedral of the Nativity of Our Lady.

Its patron saints are Francis Xavier and Catherine of Siena, and its motto is Scientia et Virtus (Knowledge and Virtue).

Stephen Lee Bun-sang is the current bishop and the third Chinese bishop of the diocese.

History 
It was established on January 23, 1576, by the edict of Pope Gregory XIII, on vast territory split off from Roman Catholic Diocese of Malacca. It originally covered China, Japan, Vietnam and the Malay archipelago, with the exception of the Philippines. From its founding, the diocese was a suffragan diocese of the Archdiocese (soon Patriarchate) of Goa, in Portuguese India.

It gradually lost most of its territory, in and around continental China:
 on February 19, 1588, to establish the Diocese of Funai (Japan)
 on September 9, 1659, Pope Alexander VII issued the Papal Bull Super cathedram principis apostolorum to establish and define the jurisdiction of the Apostolic Vicariate of Tonkin (Northern Vietnam, Laos and five adjacent provinces of southern China: Yunnan, Guizhou, Huguang, Sichuan, Guangxi), the Apostolic Vicariate of Cochinchina (Central Vietnam and five provinces of southeastern China: Zhejiang, Fujian, Guangdong, Jiangxi, Hainan), and Apostolic Vicariate of Nanjing (including five adjacent provinces: Beijing, Shanxi, Shandong, Korea and Tartary).
In 1696, Pope Innocent XII returned the provinces of Guangdong and Guangxi, and the island of Hainan to its authority.
 on April 22, 1841, to establish the then-Apostolic Prefecture of Hong Kong
 on May 10, 1848, to establish the then-Apostolic Vicariate of Guangdong-Guangxi including Hainan 
 on April 9, 1940, to establish the Diocese of Díli (on Timor)

It was made exempt in 1975, following Portugal's loss of sovereignty over Goa, its former Metropolitan.

It now only administers Macau alone, the last regions outside Macau under its administration were the parishes of Saint Joseph in Singapore (re-united with the Roman Catholic Archdiocese of Singapore c. 1972) and St. Peter's Church in Malacca (now as part of Roman Catholic Diocese of Malacca-Johor), which separated from the Diocese of Macau in 1981.

Bishops

Bishops of Macau
 Diego Núñez de Figueroa (1576–1578); rejected appointment, never consecrated
Melchior Carneiro (1576–1581), administrator
 Leonardo Fernandes de Sá, O.Cist. (1578–1597), arrived at Macau in 1581
Father Manuel de Aguiar (1597–1599), administrator
Father Miguel dos Santos, O.S.A. (1599–1607), administrator
 João de Abrantes a Pietate, O.P. (1604–1623), resigned and returned to Europe in 1615, resignation accepted in 1623
Father Antonio de Rosario (1615–1623), de facto administrator
Diogo Correia Valente (1623–1633), administrator
from 1641 to 1668, no bishops were named due to the Portuguese Restoration War between Spain and Portugal
Father Bento de Christo (1640–1642), administrator
Father Francisco de S. Thomaz, named by Peter II of Portugal in 1669 but not confirmed by the Pope
Father Giovanni Filippo de Marini (also Filippe de Marino) (1671–1677), administrator
 João de Casal (1690–1735)
 Eugénio de Trigueiros, O.E.S.A. (1735–1740), appointed Archbishop of Goa
 Hilário de Santa Rosa, O.F.M. (1740–1752)
 Bartolomeu Manoel Mendes dos Reis (1753–1773), appointed Bishop of Mariana
 Alexandre da Silva Pedrosa Guimarães (1773–1789)
 Marcelino José da Silva (1789–1802)
 Manuel de Santo Galdino, O.F.M. (1802–1804), appointed Coadjutor Archbishop and later Archbishop of Goa
 Francisco Chachim, O.F.M. Disc. (1804–1828)
 Nicolaus Rodrigues Pereira de Borja, C.M. (1843–1845)
 Jerónimo José de Mata, C.M. (1845–1862)
 Pereira Botelho do Amaral e Pimentel (1866–1871), appointed Bishop of Angra
 Manuel Bernardo de Sousa Enes (1874–1883), appointed Bishop of Bragança e Miranda and later Bishop of Portalegre
 António Joaquim de Medeiros (1884–1897)
 José Manuel de Carvalho (1897–1902), appointed Bishop of Angra
 João Paulino de Azevedo e Castro (1902–1918)
 José da Costa Nunes (1920–1940), appointed Archbishop of Goa and Daman (elevated to Cardinal in 1962)
 João de Deus Ramalho, S.J. (1942–1953)
 Policarpo da Costa Vaz (1954–1960), appointed Bishop of Guarda
 Paulo José Tavares (1961–1973)
 Arquimínio Rodrigues da Costa (1976–1988)
 Domingos Lam Ka-tseung (1988–2003)
 José Lai Hung-seng (2003–2016)
 Stephen Lee Bun-sang (2016–present)

Coadjutor Bishops
José Lai Hung-seng (2001–2003)
Domingos Lam Ka Tseung (1987–1988)
Jerónimo José de Mata, C.M. (1844–1845)
Eugénio Trigueiros, O.S.A. (1725–1735)

Parishes 
The Diocese is divided in:
 six parishes (five in Macau Peninsula and one on Taipa island):
Cathedral Parish
St. Lazarus
St. Anthony
St. Lawrence
Our Lady of Fátima
Church of Our Lady of Carmel, Taipa
 two quasi-parishes, both on Macau Peninsula:
St. Francis Xavier, Mong Há
St. Joseph, Iao Hon
 one mission (on Coloane island):
 St. Francis Xavier, Coloane

Schools 

The following schools are directly operated by the diocese:
 Preschool through secondary school
 Colégio Diocesano de São José - Sé (not in Macau's tuition-free school network)
 Colégio Diocesano de São José 5 - Nossa Senhora de Fátima (not in Macau's tuition-free school network)
 Escola de São Paulo - Nossa Senhora de Fátima
 Preschool through junior high school
 Escola do Santíssimo Rosário - Santo António (Closed)
 Preschool and primary school
 Escola Dom João Paulino - Taipa
 Escola Madalena de Canossa - Nossa Senhora de Fátima
 Escola de Santa Teresa do Menino Jesus - Nossa Senhora de Fátima

There are other Catholic schools in Macau which are operated by Catholic orders.

See also 
 List of bishops of Macau
 list of Macao-related topics
 Catholic religious institutions, associations, and communities in Macau

References

External links 
 Diocese de Macau 
 GCatholic.org with incumbent biography links
 
 UCAN Diocese profile

Macau
1576 establishments in China
1576 establishments in the Portuguese Empire
16th-century establishments in Macau
Religious organizations established in the 1570s
Macau